The 1948 John Carroll Blue Streaks football team was an American football team that represented John Carroll University as an independent during the 1948 college football season. The team compiled a 7–1–2 record, including a victory over Canisius in the Great Lakes Bowl.  Herb "Skeeter" Eisele was the team's head coach for the second year. 

Sophomore Don Shula played at the halfback position. Shula later spent more than 40 years in the National Football League as a player and coach and was inducted into the Pro Football Hall of Fame.  John Carroll's football stadium is named Don Shula Stadium in his honor.

Schedule

References

John Carroll
John Carroll Blue Streaks football seasons
John Carroll Blue Streaks football